Anomoea is a genus of leaf beetles in the subfamily Cryptocephalinae. The name is frequently confused with the tephritid fly genus Anomoia, due to historical confusion over precedence.

Selected species
 Anomoea flavokansiensis Moldenke, 1970
 Anomoea laticlavia Forster, 1771
 Anomoea nitidicollis Schaeffer, 1919
 Anomoea rufifrons Lacordaire, 1848

References

Chrysomelidae genera
Taxa named by Louis Agassiz
Cryptocephalinae